Towanda is the name of several places in the United States:

Towanda, Illinois
Towanda, Kansas
Pennsylvania:
Communities:
Towanda, Pennsylvania, a borough in Bradford County
Towanda Township, Pennsylvania, a township in Bradford County
North Towanda Township, Pennsylvania, a township in Bradford County
Streams:
Towanda Creek, a tributary of the Susquehanna River
South Branch Towanda Creek, a tributary of Towanda Creek